Pooveli is a 1998 Indian Tamil-language drama film directed by Selva. An unofficial remake (with Indian twist) of A Walk in the Clouds (1995), the film stars Karthik, Abbas, Kausalya and Heera Rajagopal. The film's score and soundtrack are composed by Bharadwaj while lyrics by Vairamuthu.

Plot
The movie opens with the main characters revealing their thoughts on love. Maha (Kausalya) feels one must love before the wedding while Shalini (Heera) feels love is for after the wedding. Radha Ravi is totally opposed to love and feels it is a way in which children cheat their parents while Murali (Karthik) is totally for it.

Murali follows Shalini around expressing his love for her. But when she insults his love, he promises he wouldn't trouble her again and that one day, she would understand him and come to him. He runs into Maha, his classmate in school, who has recently lost her lover in an accident. To force her father to accept her love, she had already told him that she was married. Circumstances force her uncle to think Murali is her husband and they go back to her house in the village.

Their plan is for Murali to earn the displeasure of the members of her household so that he can leave, but his plans backfire and earn him their love and affection. As he continues living there, he starts to like having a family around and also falls in love with Maha. The only black sheep in their family is Anandaraj, who keeps troubling them.

Maha's grandmother (Manorama), finds out the arrangement between her and Murali, but since she likes Murali, plays a trick to get them both married.

Shalini, who has meanwhile developed feelings for Murali, shows up at the village before the wedding creating doubts in the minds of the other. This leads to some confusion and problems, which are cleared in the climax.

Cast
 Karthik as Murali
 Abbas as Arun
 Kausalya as Mahalakshmi / Maha
 Heera as Shalini
 Radha Ravi as Maha's Father as Chidambaram Pillai
 Manorama as Maha's grandmother
 Nizhalgal Ravi as Chidambaram's Brother
 Charle as Chidambaram Brother's Brother-in-law
 Anandaraj as Maha's aunty Husband
 Rajasekaran as Arun's Father

Soundtrack

Music is composed by Bharadwaj. Soundtrack contains 10 songs. Lyrics written by Vairamuthu.

Release
The film became a blockbuster and completed a 100-day run, with the makers of the film coming together soon after to make another production, Rojavanam.

Kausalya won the Filmfare Best Actress Award for her performance in the film while Karthik went on to win the Tamil Nadu State Film Award Special Prize.

Critical reception

Indolink wrote:"has its good moments with consistent screenplay". Balaji wrote:" nice movie without a single boring moment". A reviewer from Deccan Herald wrote "Pooveli prompts one to look at the possibility that the life of the city may be excluding us from fuller pastures, possibilities with more life."

Remake
The film was remade in Telugu in 1999, as Alludugaaru Vachcharu with Jagapathi Babu playing the lead role while Kausalya, Abbas and Heera reprised their roles from the original in Telugu.

References

External links
 

1998 films
Tamil films remade in other languages
1990s Tamil-language films
Films scored by Bharadwaj (composer)
Indian romantic drama films
1998 romantic drama films
Films directed by Selva (director)
Films based on Four Steps in the Clouds